St. Peter's College  is a private non-sectarian coeducational basic and higher education institution located in Iligan City, Lanao del Norte, Philippines. It was founded by Miguel D. Paguio and his wife, Escolastica Punongbayan-Paguio on February 10, 1952.

Basic Education
Pre-school
Kindergarten
Elementary
Junior High School
Senior High School

Higher Education
Bachelor's degree courses
Master's degree courses

Program Offerings 
Master of Arts in Education

Bachelor of Arts

Bachelor of Elementary Education

Bachelor of Secondary Education

Bachelor of Science in Business Administration

Bachelor of Science in Computer Science

Bachelor of Science in Information Technology

Bachelor of Science in Civil Engineering

Bachelor of Science in Computer Engineering

Bachelor of Science in Computer Science

Bachelor of Science in Electrical Engineering

Bachelor of Science in Electronics & Communications Engineering

Bachelor of Science in Information Technology

Bachelor of Science in Mechanical Engineering

Bachelor of Science in Industrial Engineering

Bachelor of Science in Criminology

Teacher Certificate Program

TESDA Recognized Program:

Bookkeeping NC III

References

Universities and colleges in Iligan